MyScienceWork is a technology company that provides stuff for research institutions, scientific publishers and private-sector R&D companies. 

In parallel to its business activities, MyScienceWork offers a database hosting more than 90 million scientific publications and 12 million patents.

MyScienceWork has offices in Paris and Luxembourg and with representation in Mexico and Philadelphia.

MyScienceWork and open access 
MyScienceWork supports the circulation of open access scientific texts. Its search engine centralizes the main open access databases online, like PubMed, CiteSeer, DOAJ, Research Papers in Economics, ArXiv, HAL, BioMed Central, CERN, Persee, Revues.org, ORBI, and Public Library of Science.

In 2012 and 2013, MyScienceWork was the national coordinator of International Open Access Week in France.

Company history 
New MyScienceWork offices in Boulogne-Billancourt, Paris

2010 August: MyScienceWork is founded[9] by Virginie Simon,[10] a researcher in cancer nanotechnology, and Tristan Davaille, a financial engineer.[11]
2013 January: The global platform www.MyScienceWork.com is online to provide access to scientific databases cataloguing research publications available online:[5] Over 20 million are open access with a PDF download available and 10 million are priced for individual purchase from scientific publishers.
2014 October: First project centre outside France opens  in San Francisco, America.[12]
2014 December: The first repository platform for research information is released. [1]
2018 April: MyScienceWork launches Polaris OS an advanced open source repository solution to map, manage and measure institutional research.

See also
List of academic databases and search engines

References

Further reading 
 Article from the national Luxembourg Portal for  Innovation and Research about the Prime Minister's support of innovative start-ups: Xavier Bettel supports Luxembourg start-ups in Silicon Valley, 24 February 2015
 Article (in French) from Huffington Post about the entrepreneurial path of MyScienceWork co-founder, Virginie Simon: 'Itinéraire d'une entrepreneuse: Paris, Luxembourg et Silicon Valley', 8 July 2014
 Article (in French) from Le Monde about research networks: Des « Facebook » pour chercheurs, 14 Janvier 2012
 Article (in French) from Challenge: six conseils aux étudiants d'universités pour réussir en s'appuyant sur son réseau, 26 mai 2011
 Article (in French) about a revolution in scientific publication
 MyScienceWork on PaperJam TV

Electronic publishing
Open access publishers
Companies based in Luxembourg City
Companies based in San Francisco
Scholarly communication